Health Central is a 171-bed hospital in Ocoee, Florida. In April 2012, Orlando Health acquired Health Central for $181.3 million.

References

External links
Health Central Official Website
Orlando Health Official Website

Hospitals in Florida
Hospitals established in 1952
Hospital buildings completed in 1952
1952 establishments in Florida